Year of the Dragon is the ninth studio album by German duo Modern Talking, released on 28 February 2000 by Hansa Records. The album entered the German Albums Chart at number three on 13 March 2000 and spent two weeks in the top five. It has been certified platinum by the Bundesverband Musikindustrie (BVMI), denoting shipments in excess of 300,000 units in Germany.

Track listing

Personnel
 Dieter Bohlen – production
 Luis Rodríguez – co-production
 Amadeus Crotti – keyboards 
 Lalo Titenkov – keyboards 
 Wolfgang Wilde – photos
 Ronald Reinsberg – cover design, art direction

Charts

Weekly charts

Year-end charts

Certifications

References

2000 albums
Hansa Records albums
Modern Talking albums